This is a list of museums in Benin.

Museums in Benin 

 Alexandre Sènou Adandé Ethnographic Museum
 Musée da Silva des Arts et de la Culture
 Musee Histsorique d’ Abomey
 Musée en Plein Air de Parakou
 Ouidah Museum of History
 Royal Palace Museum (Porto-Novo)

See also 
 List of museums

External links 
 http://www.africa.com/guide_to_museums/benin_museums

Museums in Benin
Benin
Museums
Benin
Museums